Leela Zero is a free and open-source computer Go program released on 25 October 2017. It is developed by Belgian programmer Gian-Carlo Pascutto, the author of chess engine Sjeng and Go engine Leela. 

Leela Zero's algorithm is based on DeepMind's 2017 paper about AlphaGo Zero.
Unlike the original Leela, which has a lot of human knowledge and heuristics programmed into it, the program code in Leela Zero only knows the basic rules and nothing more.  The knowledge that makes Leela Zero a strong player is contained in a neural network, which is trained based on the results of previous games that the program played.

Leela Zero is trained by a distributed effort, which is coordinated at the Leela Zero website. Members of the community provide computing resources by running the client, which generates self-play games and submits them to the server. The self-play games are used to train newer networks. Generally, over 500 clients have connected to the server to contribute resources. The community has provided high quality code contributions as well.

Leela Zero finished third at the BerryGenomics Cup World AI Go Tournament in Fuzhou, Fujian, China on 28 April 2018. The New Yorker at the end of 2018 characterized Leela and Leela Zero as "the world’s most successful open-source Go engines".

In early 2018, another team branched Leela Chess Zero from the same code base, also to verify the methods in the AlphaZero paper as applied to the game of chess. AlphaZero's use of Google TPUs was replaced by a crowd-sourcing infrastructure and the ability to use graphics card GPUs via the OpenCL library. Even so, it is expected to take a year of crowd-sourced training to make up for the dozen hours that AlphaZero was allowed to train for its chess match in the paper.

References

External links

Leela Zero on GitHub
Leela Zero on Sensei's Library
Play Leela Zero on ZBaduk

Go engines
Free and open-source software
2017 software
Applied machine learning